Football Club Lyubomyr Stavyshche is a professional Ukrainian football club from the urban-type settlement of Stavyshche. The team is currently playing Ukrainian Second League after competing in the Ukrainian Amateur championship.

History

The team was founded in 2004 as a football school for rural youth. For several seasons the club was fielding its teams in national youth competitions as well as competitions of Kyiv Oblast. The club also fields its under-19 team in the PFL competitions among under-19 teams. In 2020–21 it debuted at national amateur competitions of the AAFU placing 10th among 11 teams. "Lyubomyr" debuted in the Ukrainian Second League in the 2021–22 season.

League and cup history

{|class="wikitable"
|-bgcolor="#efefef"
! Season
! Div.
! Pos.
! Pl.
! W
! D
! L
! GS
! GA
! P
!Domestic Cup
!colspan=2|Europe
!Notes
|-bgcolor=SteelBlue
|align=center|2020–21
|align=center|4th
|align=center|10
|align=center|20
|align=center|3
|align=center|4
|align=center|13
|align=center|21
|align=center|24
|align=center|13
|align=center|
|align=center|
|align=center|
|align=center bgcolor=lightgreen|Promoted
|-bgcolor=PowderBlue
|align=center|2021–22
|align=center|3rd
|align=center|
|align=center|	
|align=center|	 	
|align=center|		
|align=center|
|align=center|	 	 	
|align=center|	
|align=center|
|align=center|
|align=center|
|align=center|
|align=center|
|}

Players

Current squad

Managers
 2011–2014  Maksym Shtayer
 2015–201?  Artem Illichov
 2020–2021  Vitaliy Bilokon
 2021  Oleksandr Honcharov
 2021 – Vadym Lazorenko

References

External links
 Official website
 Profile . AAFU.

Ukrainian Second League clubs
Football clubs in Kyiv Oblast
2004 establishments in Ukraine
Association football clubs established in 2004